The Orlando Magic first participated in the National Basketball Association (NBA) Draft on June 27, 1989, about five months before their inaugural NBA season. The NBA agreed with the National Basketball Players' Association to limit drafts to two rounds from 1989 onward. Before each draft, an NBA draft lottery determines the first round selection order for the teams that missed the playoffs during the prior season. Teams can also trade their picks, so some years a team could have more than or less than two picks.

The Magic were given their two picks in 1989. They selected Nick Anderson with the eleventh overall pick and Michael Ansley with the 37th pick. In 1992, the Magic won the NBA Lottery and with the first pick, they drafted Shaquille O'Neal, who  went on to be selected as an All-Star a record-tying 14 consecutive times. In 2004, the Magic drafted a future All-Star, Dwight Howard. Throughout  the years, the Magic had traded away some of their picks as well as traded for other teams' picks. As a result of the various trades, the Orlando Magic had three first round picks in 1998 and 2000.

Key

Selections

References

External links
 

 
National Basketball Association draft
draft history